This is the results breakdown of the local elections held in the Community of Madrid on 28 May 1995. The following tables show detailed results in the autonomous community's most populous municipalities, sorted alphabetically.

Overall

City control
The following table lists party control in the most populous municipalities, including provincial capitals (shown in bold). Gains for a party are displayed with the cell's background shaded in that party's colour.

Municipalities

Alcalá de Henares
Population: 166,250

Alcobendas
Population: 83,990

Alcorcón
Population: 142,165

Coslada
Population: 79,240

Fuenlabrada
Population: 158,212

Getafe
Population: 144,368

Leganés
Population: 178,162

Madrid

Population: 3,041,101

Móstoles
Population: 199,141

Parla
Population: 72,145

Torrejón de Ardoz
Population: 87,219

See also
1995 Madrilenian regional election

References

Madrid
1995